Grozny attack may refer to:

1999 Grozny ballistic missile attack
1999 Grozny refugee convoy shooting
2000 Novye Aldi massacre, suburb of Grozny
2000 Grozny OMON fratricide incident
2002 Grozny truck bombing
2004 Grozny stadium bombing
2010 Chechen Parliament attack

See also
Suicide attacks in the North Caucasus conflict
1958 Grozny riots
Battle of Grozny (November 1994)
Battle of Grozny (1994–95)
Battle of Grozny (August 1996)
1999 Russian bombing of Chechnya, including Grozny
Battle of Grozny (1999–2000)
2004 raid on Grozny
2014 Grozny clashes